Linda Curl is an English former football midfielder or forward who played for the England women's national football team.

Curl made her England debut as a 15-year-old, in a 9–1 friendly win over Switzerland, staged at Boothferry Park, Hull, on 28 April 1977. She continued playing for England until 1990. She won the WFA Cup with Lowestoft Ladies in 1982 and Norwich in 1986, scoring in both finals. Outside of football she worked as a police officer.

In the 1984 European Competition for Women's Football final, England lost the first away leg 1–0 against Sweden, after a header from Pia Sundhage. They won the second home leg by the same margin, with a goal from Curl. England lost the subsequent penalty shootout 4–3, as both Curl and Lorraine Hanson had their spot kicks saved by Elisabeth Leidinge.

Honours

Club
Lowestoft
FA Women's Cup: 1981–82

Norwich
FA Women's Cup: 1985–86

References

External links

Women's association football forwards
English women's footballers
England women's international footballers
Living people
Date of birth missing (living people)
Year of birth missing (living people)
Lowestoft Ladies F.C. players